Mikaela Gerber (born June 13, 1995) is a Canadian artistic gymnast.  She is the younger sister of Aisha Gerber.

Junior career

2009 
In June, Gerber competed at the Canadian Championships in Hamilton, Canada.  She placed second in the all around final with a score of 53.600 and first in the floor final with a score of 14.200.

2010 
In May, Gerber competed at the Canadian Championships in Kamloops, Canada.  She placed second in the all around final with a score of 54.550 and second in the balance beam final with a score of 13.350.

Senior career

2011 
In October, Gerber competed at the 2011 World Artistic Gymnastics Championships.  She helped the Canadian team place eleventh with scores of 13.566 on vault, 13.200 on balance beam, and 13.800 on floor.

Later in October, Gerber competed at the 2011 Pan American Games in Guadalajara, Mexico.  She helped the Canadian team win the silver medal in the team event with an individual all around score of 53.150.  She placed second in the floor final with a score of 13.775.

2012 
In April, Gerber placed seventh in the vault final at the Artistic Gymnastics World Cup in Osijek, Croatia with a score of 13.513.

In May, Gerber competed at the Canadian Championships in Regina, Canada.  She placed twelfth in the all around final with a score of 51.250.  In event finals, she placed eighth on vault scoring 13.200 and fourth on balance beam scoring 13.500.

At the end of June, Gerber was one of the twelve gymnasts chosen to compete at the Final Olympic Selection meet in Gatineau, Canada.  On the first day of competition she placed fifth in the all around with a score of 52.450.  She was not chosen to be part of the Olympic team.

References

External links
 Mikaela Gerber at Gymnastics Canada
 Mikaela Gerber  at Fédération Internationale de Gymnastique

Living people
Canadian female artistic gymnasts
1995 births
Pan American Games silver medalists for Canada
Pan American Games medalists in gymnastics
Gymnasts at the 2011 Pan American Games
Medalists at the 2011 Pan American Games
20th-century Canadian women
21st-century Canadian women